in Japan were long-distance sleeper trains, nicknamed as such for the color of the train cars. They consisted of 20-, 14- or 24-series sleeper cars, and connected major destinations within Japan across long distances. For a time, other routes were served by a fleet of newer limited-express overnight trains, which were not blue.

Services slowly began to be eliminated as the Shinkansen (bullet train) network spread and as regional airports opened in the 1980s and 1990s; afterwards, five Blue Train services were eliminated in 2008 and 2009, six more between 2010 and 2015, and the final services in 2016. Aside from luxury "land cruise" excursion trains such as Seven Stars in Kyushu, this has left just two overnight express trains (the combined Sunrise Izumo and Sunrise Seto) as the only trains in Japan with sleeping accommodation.

History
The first Blue Train was known as the Asakaze. It ran between Hakata and Tokyo beginning in 1956; air-conditioned cars were added two years later. As was the case with sleeper train services in other parts of the world, the Blue Trains acquired a romantic aspect and, at the peak of their popularity in the late 1970s, appeared in many novels. They were sometimes described as "moving hotels".

However, as buses, airplanes, and the Shinkansen became faster, more popular, and sometimes cheaper, the Blue Trains saw a severe decline in ridership and therefore revenues. 2005 ridership on sleeper trains traveling west from Tokyo was calculated as one fifth of that in 1987. For this and other reasons, such as aging equipment and a shortage of overnight staff, JR made plans to eliminate the majority of the overnight services.

The Asakaze service connecting Hakata and Tokyo was eliminated in 2005, its average occupancy below 30 percent. The Hayabusa and Fuji were eliminated in March 2009. The daily Hokuriku train from Tokyo to Kanazawa was discontinued on 13 March 2010 along with its former Blue Train counterpart, the Noto.

Services like the Cassiopeia (a Blue Train in all but color) retained some popularity among tourists until the completion of the Shinkansen line to Hokkaido.

Discontinued services

Limited express sleeper trains
 Akatsuki – connected Kyoto and Nagasaki; discontinued in March 2008.
 Akebono – connected Ueno (Tokyo) and Aomori; discontinued in March 2014.
 Aki – connected Shin-Osaka and Shimonoseki; discontinued in October 1978.
 Asakaze – connected Tokyo and Shimonoseki; discontinued in 2005.
 Cassiopeia – connected Ueno (Tokyo) and Sapporo three times a week; used deluxe cars; discontinued in March 2016.
 Chōkai – connected Ueno and Aomori; merged with Akebono in March 1997.
 Dewa – connected Ueno and Akita; merged with Chōkai in December 1993.
 Fuji – connected Tokyo and Ōita; discontinued in March 2009.
 Hakutsuru – connected Ueno and Aomori; discontinued in November 2002.
 Hayabusa – connected Tokyo and Kumamoto; discontinued in March 2009.
 Hokuriku – connected Ueno and Kanazawa; discontinued in March 2010.
 Hokusei – connected Ueno and Morioka; discontinued in November 1982.
 Hokutosei – connected Ueno and Sapporo; discontinued in August 2015.
 Inaba – connected Tokyo and Yonago; discontinued in October 1978.
 Kii – connected Tokyo and Kii-Katsuura; discontinued in January 1984.
 Mizuho – connected Tokyo and Kumamoto/Nagasaki; discontinued in December 1996.
 Myōjō – connected Shin-Osaka and Nishi-Kagoshima; discontinued in November 1986.
 Naha – connected Kyoto and Kumamoto; discontinued in March 2008.
 Nihonkai – connected Osaka and Aomori; discontinued in March 2012.
 Sakura – connected Tokyo and Nagasaki/Sasebo; discontinued in March 2005.
 Suisei – connected Kyoto and Minami-Miyazaki; discontinued in October 2005.
 Tsurugi – connected Osaka and Niigata; discontinued in December 1996.
 Twilight Express – connected Osaka and Sapporo four times a week; used deluxe cars; discontinued from 12 March 2015 and replaced by Twilight Express Mizukaze in 2017. 
 Yūzuru – connected Ueno and Aomori; discontinued in March 1988.

Express sleeper trains
 Amanogawa – connected Ueno and Akita; discontinued in March 1985.
 Chikuma – connected Nagano and Osaka; downgraded from Blue Train status in October 1997; discontinued in October 2005.
 Daisen – connected Osaka and Izumoshi; downgraded from Blue Train status in October 1999, discontinued in October 2004.
 Kaimon – connected Mojikō and Nishi-Kagoshima; replaced by Dream Tsubame in March 1993.
 Kitaguni – connected Osaka and Niigata; downgraded from Blue Train status in March 1985.
 Marimo – connected Sapporo and Kushiro; downgraded from Blue Train status in March 1993; discontinued in August 2008.
 Myōkō – connected Ueno and Naoetsu via the Shin'etsu Main Line; downgraded from Blue Train status in March 1985; discontinued in March 1993.
 Nichinan – connected Hakata and Nishi-Kagoshima via the Nippō Main Line; replaced in March 1993 by Dream Nichirin.
 Noto – connected Ueno and Kanazawa via the Shin'etsu Main Line; downgraded from Blue Train status in March 1993; discontinued in March 2010.
 Rishiri – connected Sapporo and Wakkanai; downgraded from Blue Train status in March 1991; discontinued in September 2007.
 Sanbe – connected Yonago and Hakata; discontinued in February 1984.
 Shinsei – connected Ueno and Sendai; discontinued in November 1982.
 Taisetsu – connected Sapporo and Abashiri; replaced in March 1992 by Okhotsk.
 Towada – connected Ueno and Aomori via the Jōban Line; discontinued in March 1985.
 Tsugaru – connected Ueno and Aomori via the Ōu Main Line; discontinued in March 1985.

Notes

References

Further reading

External links
 

Night trains of Japan